Ethmia conglobata is a moth in the family Depressariidae. It is found in Colombia.

The ground color of the forewings is whitish, largely replaced by brownish gray clouding except in the terminal area. The ground color of the hindwings is whitish basally, becoming pale brownish on the apical half. Adults have been recorded in November and May.

References

Moths described in 1912
conglobata